Holoscolex is a genus of South American earthworm.

References

Haplotaxida